Rumpler (also spelled Rümpler) is a German surname. Notable people with the surname include:
Carl Rümpler ( 19th-century), German publisher
Edmund Rumpler (1872–1940), Austrian automobile and aircraft designer
Franz Rumpler (1848–1922), Austrian genre painter
Karl Theodor Rümpler (1817–1891), German botanist and horticulturist
Yves Rumpler (born 1938), French primatologist

See also
Rumpler (disambiguation)